The 1937 World Table Tennis Championships – Swaythling Cup (men's team) was the 11th edition of the men's team championship.  

United States won the gold medal after defeating Hungary 5–3 in the final.

Swaythling Cup table

Final

+ drawn

See also
List of World Table Tennis Championships medalists

References

-